The 2003 IBF World Championships (World Badminton Championships) took place in the National Indoor Arena in Birmingham, England, between July 28 and August 3, 2003. Following the results in the women's singles.

Seeds

Main stage

Section 1

Section 2

Section 3

Section 4

Final stage

References
http://www.tournamentsoftware.com/sport/tournament.aspx?id=40F38303-C037-45A9-93CB-C7A7AAED7AFC

Women's singles
IBF